The 2019 CONCACAF Beach Soccer Championship was the eighth edition of the CONCACAF Beach Soccer Championship, the premier beach soccer tournament contested by North American men's national teams and organised by CONCACAF (seventh official edition, tenth edition if qualifying tournaments held jointly with CONMEBOL are also counted). The tournament took place in Puerto Vallarta, Mexico between 13–19 May 2019.

The championship also acts as the qualification tournament for CONCACAF teams to the 2019 FIFA Beach Soccer World Cup in Paraguay; the top two teams qualify.

Panama were the defending champions, but lost in the third-place match.

Teams
A total of 16 teams compete in the tournament.

Draw
The draw was held on 8 April 2019 at the Calle Independencia in Puerto Vallarta. The 16 teams were drawn into four groups of four.

Squads

Each squad can contain a maximum of 12 players.

Group stage
Each team earns three points for a win in regulation time, two points for a win in extra time, one point for a win in a penalty shoot-out, and no points for a defeat. The top two teams from each group advance to the quarter-finals.

All times are local, CDT (UTC−5).

Group A

Group B

Group C

Group D

Knockout stage

Bracket

Quarter-finals

Semi-finals
Winners qualify for 2019 FIFA Beach Soccer World Cup.

Third place match

Final

Awards
The following awards were given at the conclusion of the tournament:

Qualified teams for FIFA Beach Soccer World Cup
The following two teams from CONCACAF qualify for the 2019 FIFA Beach Soccer World Cup.

1 Bold indicates champions for that year. Italic indicates hosts for that year.

References

External links
, CONCACAF.com
2019 Concacaf Beach Soccer Championship Puerto Vallarta , at Beach Soccer Worldwide

Beach Soccer Championship
Beach Soccer Championship
Concacaf
International association football competitions hosted by Mexico
2019
2019 in beach soccer
May 2019 sports events in Mexico